Rudradāman I (r. 130–150) was a Śaka ruler from the Western Kshatrapas dynasty. He was the grandson of the king Caṣṭana. Rudradāman I was instrumental in the decline of the Sātavāhana Empire. Rudradāman I took up the title of Maha-kshtrapa ("Great Satrap"), after he became the king and then strengthened his kingdom.

Reign
As a result of his victories, Rudradāman regained all the former territories previously held by Nahapana, except for the southern territory of Poona and Nasik.  The indigenous Nagas also were aggressive toward Śaka kshatrapas. Sātavāhana dominions were limited to their original base in the Deccan and eastern central India around Amaravati:

War with the Yaudheyas 

Rudradāman conquered the Yaudheya tribes in present day Haryana, as described in the Girnar rock inscription of Rudradaman. Rudradaman refers to the Yaudheyas as a militant republic of kshatriyas that confronted him as opposed to submitting:

However, the Yaudheyas soon reestablished themselves as independent.  Within the next century the warlike Yaudheyas became more powerful. The Yaudheyas were then conquered by the Kushan Empire, who were the suzerains of the Western Kshatrapas, until ultimately by the Gupta Empire.

Wars with the Satavahana Dynasty 
Rudradāman fought many battles against the Sātavāhanas (or the Āndhras) and Vashishtiputra Satakarni, the son of the Āndhra king Pulamayi, in an effort to end the hostilities, married the daughter of Rudradāman. The inscription relating the marriage between Rudradāman's daughter and Vashishtiputra Satakarni appears in a cave at Kanheri:

Rudradaman maintained matrimonial relationships with Sātavāhanas and conceded the country of Aparanta to Vashishtiputra Satakarni, his son-in-law and younger son of Gautamiputra Satakarni, as dowry. In spite of the matrimonial link, at least two wars took place between them wherein he defeated Sātavāhanas but spared the life of Satakarni (probably, Vashishtiputra Satakarni), essentially because of their relationship. However, it is not known who was the aggressor in either of the wars and whether there were more wars between them.

Other details 

The Sanskrit Junagadh inscription dated 150 CE credits Rudradāman I with supporting the cultural arts and Sanskrit literature and repairing the dam built by the Mauryans. He in fact repaired the embankments of the lake Sudarśana, which was constructed by the Mauryas for checking floods.

Rudradāman is also known as the king who was ruling when the Greek writer Yavanesvara translated the Yavanajataka from Greek to Sanskrit, which influenced astrology in India.

While most of the scholars, following Rapson believe that Rudradāman ruled from Ujjain, there is no such evidence to support this.  In fact, there is evidence to prove the contrary:
 Jain sources mention that after Nahapana (40 years) and Gardabhilas (15 years), Śakas will rule Ujjain but for only four years. Caṣṭana no doubt has ruled Ujjain but he must have ruled it only for four years. His son Jayadāman (a Kshatrapa as against Caṣṭana being a Mahaksatrapa) was an ineffectual king and lost most of the territory won by Caṣṭana. This must have included all important Ujjain as well.
 Natural History of Claudius Ptolemy in 160 CE record Caṣṭana as the king of Avanti while it is known that it is Rudradāman who was ruling between 130 and 150 CE. Ptolemy was obviously referring only to the last best known ruler and if Rudradāman was ruling Avanti, he would have mentioned him, since he was certainly well known through his conquests.
 Truly speaking, Rudradāman made no reference to Avanti. He said he conquered Eastern and Western Akaravanti (Eastern Malwa) - Western Akaravanti being land lying east to Bhopal, which does not include any western part of Malwa or Avanti. Akaravanti, earlier called as Sudarsana, comprised only Eastern Malwa. Western Akaravanti does not refer to Avanti.

Notes

References 

 Todd, James - The Annals and Antiquities of Rajasthan, Rajputana Publications, 1942
 Michell, George - PRINCELY RAJASTHAN - Rajput Palaces and Mansions, Oriental Books, 1992
 Rosenfield, "The dynastic art of the Kushans"

 Buddhist critical spirituality: Prajñā and Śūnyatā, by Shōhei Ichimura, Motilal Banarsidass Publishers (2001),

External links
 Coins of the Western Satraps
 Coins of Rudradaman I

Converts to Hinduism
History of Malwa
Western Satraps
2nd-century Indian monarchs
People from Ujjain